Franklinella is an  extinct genus of crustaceans of the class of the ostracods (seed shrimp).

Species 
 Franklinella calcarata (Richter, 1856) Pribyl, 1950 †
 Franklinella curvata Kupfahl, 1956 †
  Stewart & Hendrix, 1945 †

References

Sources

Myodocopida

Prehistoric ostracod genera